Shinebayar Sukhbaatar 'Shinny Bayaar' (born 27 August 1977) is a Mongolian professional boxer with British nationality fighting in the flyweight division. He is based in Oldham, Greater Manchester and is the former British Flyweight champion.

Professional career
Bayaar's professional debut came on 25 February 2000 in Mongolia with a draw against over fellow Mongolian Yuma Dima.  His very next fight saw him travel to the Philippines to meet the experienced Manny Melchor for the WBC International Minimumweight title on 28 June 2000.  The fight resulted in a defeat for the novice Bayaar who lost on points over 12 rounds.

Bayaar travelled to the UK and his next contest also ended in defeat, losing over 8 rounds to Damian Dunnion at a small hall show in Stoke on 10 October 2001.  He fought only twice more over the next two years winning on each occasion at bills held at the Tara Leisure Centre in Shaw, Greater Manchester.  A third defeat for Bayaar came on 20 March 2003 against Nigerian Sunkanmi Ogunbiyi although two more fights that year resulted in two more wins giving Bayaar a professional record of 4-3-1 at the end of 2003.

Three more fights in 2004 saw a mixed bag for the Mongolian, beating unbeaten Norwegian Reidar Walstad with a first round stoppage yet losing to the unbeaten Martin Power on points over 10 rounds.  Power would go on to become the British bantamweight champion.  Over the next three years Bayaar only had four more fights with only a victory over the then unbeaten Canadian boxer Andrew Singh Kooner on 15 September 2006 standing out.  At the end of 2007 Bayaar had improved his professional record to 10-4-1.

British citizenship and the title
Bayaar fought twice in 2008 beating Ghanain journeyman Sumaila Badu in April and Spaniard Jordi Gallart in November.  In 2009 Bayaar trod water with a win over journeyman Daniel Thorpe before having his application for British citizenship granted and being given the opportunity to fight for the British Flyweight title.  The fight for the title on 23 October 2009 took place at the Bolton Arena and pitted Bayaar against reigning champion Chris Edwards.  Bayaar extended his winning run with a split decision victory over Edwards who later said he was "gobsmacked" by the verdict.

Shinny's first fight of 2010 pitched him against Najah Ali at the Indoor Sports Center in Leigh, the fight was only a six rounder and not a title fight although Bayaar only scored a narrow points victory.  The first defence of his title was set for Dagenham on 14 May 2010 against the unbeaten English champion Ashley Sexton.  The fight resulted in a draw with Bayaar suffering a nasty cut in the later rounds.  On 15 December 2010 Bayaar lost the title to Paul Edwards after an accidental clash of heads in the first round of their fight in Belfast resulted in a deep cut opening in the center of Bayaar's head and the fight being called off.  Bayaar next fought on 10 December 2011 and went straight back into British championship action facing former opponent Chris Edwards who had defeated Paul Edwards to reclaim the title earlier in the year.  The fight went the distance and resulted in another loss for Bayaar as Edwards successfully defended the title.

References

Mongolian male boxers
Mongolian emigrants to the United Kingdom
Naturalised citizens of the United Kingdom
Flyweight boxers
1977 births
Living people
People from Oldham
British male boxers